Alexander William Johnston (20 August 1869 – 15 June 1932) was a British-born soldier, businessman and politician. He was a member of the Legislative Council in Western Samoa from 1928 until his death in 1932.

Biography
Johnston was born in Edinburgh in 1869. He served in the British Army in India and South Africa, before being sent to New Zealand to work as a military instructor. In 1915 he was part of the first reinforcement contingent that arrived in Western Samoa during World War I. He was discharged from the military in 1920. After leaving the army, he became branch manager of the Burns Philp company in Saluafata district.

Johnston contested the 1926 elections to the Legislative Council, but was unsuccessful. However, in 1928 he was appointed to the Council by the Administrator to replace elected member Olaf Frederick Nelson, who had been deported. Prior to the 1929 elections, Johnston resigned from his nominated seat and stood for one of the elected seats. He was elected with the most votes, alongside Samuel Meredith.

Johnston died of pneumonia on 15 June 1932, and was given a military funeral.

References

1869 births
Politicians from Edinburgh
British Army personnel of World War I
20th-century Samoan businesspeople
Members of the Legislative Council of Samoa
1932 deaths
Deaths from pneumonia in Samoa